Joseph Lateiner (1853 – 1935) was a playwright in the early years of Yiddish theater, first in Bucharest, Romania and later in New York City, where he was a co-founder in 1903 with Sophia Karp of the Grand Theater, New York's first purpose-built Yiddish language theater building.

Born in Iaşi, Romania, Lateiner got his start writing for theater in Iaşi around the start of 1878, when Israel Grodner, having left Abraham Goldfaden's Bucharest company, needed a playwright. He added some topical material to a comic German story Nathan Schlemiehl, and came up with a play Die Tzwei Schmil Schmelkes (The Two Schmil Schmelkes). He translated and "Yiddishized" plays from Romanian and German; his more than 80 plays included Mishke and Moshke: Europeans in America (or The Greenhorns), "Satan in the Garden of Eden", and "The Jewish Heart".

By showing that Goldfaden was not the only person who could write a successful play in Yiddish, he opened the floodgates for other Yiddish playwrights.

References 

 Adler, Jacob, A Life on the Stage: A Memoir, translated and with commentary by Lulla Rosenfeld, Knopf, New York, 1999, . 77 (commentary).

1853 births
1935 deaths
Yiddish theatre
Jewish Romanian writers
Romanian emigrants to the United States
Writers from Iași
Jewish dramatists and playwrights